Atrichops crassipes is a species of watersnipe fly in the family Athericidae.

Distribution
Europe.

References

Athericidae
Insects described in 1820
Diptera of Europe
Taxa named by Johann Wilhelm Meigen